Charles William Thomas II (April 24,1926 – September 29,1990) was an African American psychologist and one of the founders of the Association of Black Psychologists.

Early life and education 
Charles William Thomas II was born on April 24, 1926, in Davidson, Maryland. After serving in the U.S. Army during World War II, Thomas attended Morgan State University, in his home state. He earned a Bachelor's degree in Psychology in 1954. After earning his bachelor's degree, Thomas earned his Master of Arts at John Carroll University in 1955. While he was a graduate student at John Carroll University, Thomas also worked as an intern in Clinical Psychology for the Cleveland Receiving Hospital. After he obtained his Master's degree, Thomas worked for a rehabilitation and vocational guidance center in Cleveland, Ohio. During this time, he completed his Ph.D. in Developmental Psychology at Case Western Reserve.

Academic career 

Once he finished his academic training, Thomas taught at John Carroll University for two years. He was then an Assistant Professor at the University of Oregon for three years. During his professorship at the University of Oregon, Thomas was one of the first African American professors at that university. While at the University of Oregon, he created more diversity initiatives on campus. For his diversity initiatives, Thomas invited African American musicians, singers, and comedians to perform on campus.

Thomas was not having the impact he wanted to have at the University of Oregon, and as such, he accepted a role as an Associate Professor of Community Medicine at the University of Southern California. Over the next three years, Thomas directed the Center for the Study of Racial and Social Issues. He stayed at the University of Southern California for two years before becoming a professor of Urban and Rural Studies at the University of California, San Diego, where he worked for the rest of his life. 

While at UC-San Diego, Thomas focused on connecting with the local community. He aimed to bring together the community and the new urban planning studies undergraduate program. Thomas' efforts allowed for an awareness inside the community and university that would impact social change.

While he was a professor, Thomas also helped form the Association of Black Psychology (ABP). This professional activity helped Thomas become known as the "Father of Black Psychology."

Scholarship 
As one of the founders of the ABP, Thomas shaped the early history of Black psychology within American universities. Thomas wanted more respect and engagement from those who were a part of the "radical" schools. Thomas wanted Black people to feel that they belonged in U.S. society and that they had purpose regardless of their racial identity. Thomas fought for the idea that Black people should have an equal place in the United States.

"Boys No More" 
In October 1968, Thomas published a paper titled "Boys No More: Some Social Psychological Aspects of the New Black Ethic." Thomas started this article by noting that people oftentimes will use others to help themselves. These people would classify others as inferior and, in doing so, they would be able to remain in a position of power and influence. Thomas recorded that society managed to keep racial groups within a subordinate role for a long time, including in such institutions as formal education.

In this article, Thomas penned that Black people should be able to do things they want without shame. This included wearing a natural hairstyle or wearing clothes that are recognized as traditionally African American. Most importantly, Thomas wanted people to be confident in being able to achieve their goals.  

Thomas stated that Black mobilization was the best chance to have more freedom and justice for the Black community. Black mobilization involved having people willing to say that they are proud of being Black. Black mobilization also meant unifying the Black community. Thomas ended his article by relaying that now is a time for being proactive rather than sitting back and hoping change happens.

"Challenges of Change" 
On November 8, 1968, Thomas wrote in "Challenges of Change" that every person faces societal challenges. Some of these challenges include factors such as age, sex, and racial identity. Thomas claimed that socially disengaged or minority groups are the victims of not having adequate freedom. Thomas acknowledged that change can be a scary thing that people shy away from because change is intimidating.

Thomas noted that society should not blame Black people for the United States' problems. He wrote that Black people ought to be able to function within society without being looked at as "mentally ill" or "inferior." This included housing and job employment that were adequate as neither were adequate or sanitary for a healthy life. Thomas ended his remarks by conveying the challenges within society that were becoming more intense. In addition, he contended that more effort needed to be put towards finding a solution rather than ignoring the problem of racism in the U.S.

Personal life 
Thomas was married to Shirley Wade, an educational sociologist, and they had two children, Charles III and Shawn Leilane.

Death 
On September 29, 1990, an unknown assailant stabbed and murdered Thomas with a knife. Thomas was rushed to the hospital, where he underwent emergency surgery. Thomas died from his wounds. Authorities were never able to identify the assailant or determine their motive for murdering Thomas.

References 

Wikipedia Student Program
1926 births
1990 deaths
African-American psychologists
20th-century American psychologists
Morgan State University alumni
John Carroll University alumni
Case Western Reserve University alumni
20th-century African-American people
University of California, San Diego faculty
University of Oregon faculty
University of Southern California faculty